The Doctrine of Chances was the first textbook on probability theory, written by 18th-century French mathematician Abraham de Moivre and first published in 1718. De Moivre wrote in English because he resided in England at the time, having fled France to escape the persecution of Huguenots. The book's title came to be synonymous with probability theory, and accordingly the phrase was used in Thomas Bayes' famous posthumous paper An Essay towards solving a Problem in the Doctrine of Chances, wherein a version of Bayes' theorem was first introduced.

Editions
The full title of the first edition was The doctrine of chances: or, a method for calculating the probabilities of events in play; it was published in 1718, by W. Pearson, and ran for 175 pages.
Published in 1738 by Woodfall and running for 258 pages, the second edition of de Moivre's book introduced the concept of normal distributions as approximations to binomial distributions. In effect de Moivre proved a special case of the central limit theorem.  Sometimes his result is called the theorem of de Moivre–Laplace.
A third edition was published posthumously in 1756 by A. Millar, and ran for 348 pages; additional material in this edition included an application of probability theory to actuarial science in the calculation of annuities.

References

Further reading
.

External links
The third edition of The Doctrine of Chances.
Full text of “The Doctrine of Chances”, 1st edition; from books.google.com
The Doctrine of Chance at MathPages

Doctrine of Chances, The
Doctrine of Chances, The
Doctrine of Chances (2nd edition), The
Doctrine of Chances (3rd edition), The
Doctrine of Chances, The
1718 in science